San Miguelito is a municipality in the Río San Juan department of Nicaragua.

The first settlement in the area, to the east of the current location, was known as "Las Aldeas" and was founded between the years 1850 and 1855.

Twin towns – sister cities

San Miguelito is twinned with:
 Waltrop, Germany

References

Municipalities of the Río San Juan Department